Itea virginica, commonly known as Virginia willow or Virginia sweetspire, is a small North American flowering shrub that grows in low-lying woods and wetland margins. Virginia willow is a member of the Iteaceae family, and native to the southeast United States. Itea virginica has small flowers on pendulous racemes. 

Depending on location, the species will bloom in late spring to early summer. It prefers moist rich soil, but it can tolerate a wide range of soil types. When Virginia willow is used in horticulture it can form large colonies and may form dense root suckers, making the shrub hard to remove.

Description
The flowers are white or cream, borne in downward pointing slightly curved spikes, in summer. It is a multi-stemmed, suckering and colonizing plant, with the stems branching infrequently except at the tops. In favorable conditions it may become semi-evergreen. The leaves turn shades of red in fall (autumn). It is hardy down to at least .

Conservation 
Itea virginica has a current IUCN status of Least Concern. However, Itea virginica is considered extirpated in Pennsylvania and endangered in Indiana.

Taxonomy  
Itea virginica belongs to the Iteaceae, a family of deciduous and evergreen shrubs. It is the only species in its genus in North America; most Itea species are from east Asia. Some authors have historically placed Virginia sweetspire in the Grossulariaceae or Saxifragaceae families.

Horticulture 
In cultivation in the UK the cultivar ‘Henry’s Garnet’ has gained the Royal Horticultural Society’s Award of Garden Merit. Itea virginica is used as a native ornamental landscape plant in North America, and numerous cultivars have been named. The flowers attract pollinators, and the shrub can be used for erosion control.

References

External links

Proven Winners 

Saxifragales
Flora of Alabama
Plants described in 1753
Taxa named by Carl Linnaeus
Trees of the Southeastern United States